Occidental Park, also referred to as Occidental Square (north of S. Main Street) and Occidental Mall (south of S. Main Street), is a 0.6 acre (2,400 m²) public park located in the Pioneer Square district of Seattle, Washington.

Description and history 
Created in 1971, the park consists of the Occidental Avenue S. right-of-way between S. Washington and S. Jackson Streets, in addition to half a city block between S. Main and S. Jackson Streets. The former Waterfront Streetcar bisected the park, running along S. Main Street. The park is in the heart of Seattle's largest art gallery district, and several galleries face onto Occidental Mall. The Downtown Seattle Association began "activating" the park with summertime seating and activities in 2015 under a public–private partnership, also bringing events to be hosted in the park.

Occidental Park is the starting point for the "March to the Match", a parade of Seattle Sounders FC supporters to Century Link Field prior to each home game.

The Fallen Firefighters Memorial is a bronze sculpture group by Hai Ying Wu. It was inspired by the deaths of four Seattle firefighters who died January 5, 1995 fighting a fire in the Mary Pang warehouse in Seattle's International District.

See also
Occidental Hotel

References

External links

Occidental Park

Parks in Seattle
Pioneer Square, Seattle
Squares in Seattle